Belle de Fontenay is a small fingerling potato variety with yellow skin and yellow flesh. This heirloom variety was released in France in 1885. 

This variety has a firm, waxy texture and is suitable for salads and soup. This variety has a long shaped tuber with a shallow eye depth and smooth skin. The colour of the base of the light sprout is blue, the maturity is first early, the flowers are a blue violet colour and there are no berries on the plant of this species.

References

Potato cultivars